McFarland House or MacFarland House may refer to:

Canada
 McFarland House, Niagara-on-the-Lake, built 1800 and managed by the Niagara Parks Commission

United States
(by state)
MacFarland House (Stanford, California), listed on the NRHP in Santa Clara County, California
McFarland-Render House, La Grange, Georgia, listed on the NRHP in Troup County, Georgia
 McFarland House (Charleston, Illinois), listed on the NRHP in Coles County, Illinois
 McFarland House (Georgetown, Kentucky), listed on the NRHP in Scott County, Kentucky
 Mundy-McFarland House, Mansfield, Louisiana, listed on the NRHP in De Sota Parish, Louisiana
William McFarland House, Worcester, Massachusetts, NRHP-listed
William and Margaret McFarland Core Farm, Bingham Township, Leelanau County, Michigan, listed on the NRHP in Leelanau County, Michigan
Duncan McFarland House, Bentleyville, Ohio, listed on the NRHP in Cuyahoga County, Ohio
 McCracken-McFarland House, Cambridge, Ohio, NRHP-listed
James McFarland House, Mount Vernon, Ohio, listed on the NRHP in Knox County, Ohio
 Eddleman-McFarland House, Fort Worth, Texas, listed on the NRHP in Tarrant County, Texas
MacFarland House (Charleston, West Virginia), NRHP-listed in Kanawha County
 McFarland House (McFarland, Wisconsin), listed on the NRHP in Dane County, Wisconsin